Mass Rapid Transit Corporation may refer to:

Mass Rapid Transit Corporation (Malaysia)
SMRT Corporation in Singapore that was previously known as the Mass Rapid Transit Corporation